The women's 10,000 metres event at the 2019 African Games was held on 29 August in Rabat.

Results

References

10000
2019 in women's athletics